Big air is a high-injury-risk sports discipline where the competitor rides a vehicle, such as a motocross motorcycle, a skateboard, a snowboard, or a pair of skis, down a hill or ramp and performs aerial tricks after launching off very large jumps. In most versions, there is one large jump and therefore only one opportunity to perform a trick. It is an extreme version of slopestyle. Competitors perform complex tricks in the air, aiming to attain sizable height and distance as well, all while making every effort to secure a clean landing. Many competitions also require the rider to do a specific trick to win the major prize.
The term was coined by French-Canadians because of their love for the extreme nature of the event.

Skiing and snowboarding
Since 2004, Big Air Skiing has been featured in the FIS Snowboard World Championships. 

In 2018, Big Air became the newest snowboarding event introduced in the Olympic Games.

In the 2022 Winter Olympic Games, the ski Big Air event was held for the first time in Olympic history. The dedicated venue was Big Air Shougang.

References

Snowboarding
Freestyle skiing
Freestyle motocross